Ninth Avenue may refer to:

Roads
 Ninth Avenue (Manhattan), New York City, U.S.
 Ninth Avenue (Islamabad), Islamabad, Pakistan

Subway/Transit stations
Ninth Avenue (BMT West End Line), a subway station
Irving and 8th Avenue / 9th Avenue and Irving stations

Transit lines
IRT Ninth Avenue Line